Szprotawa  is a town in western Poland, in Żagań County, Lubusz Voivodeship. It has 11,820 inhabitants (2019).

History

The region was part of Poland after the emergence of the Piast monarchy in the 10th century. The first mention of today's Szprotawa comes at 1000 in the chronicle of bishop Thietmar of Merseburg, who accompanied the emperor Otto III on pilgrimage to the grave of Saint Adalbert in Gniezno. Iława, currently a district of Szprotawa, is one of the two hypothetical locations where emperor Otto III and Polish ruler Bolesław the Brave could have met. The area was part of medieval Poland, and later on, it was part of the Polish Duchy of Głogów, created as a result of the fragmentation of Poland. It was ruled by the Piasts and Jagiellons, including future Kings of Poland John I Albert and Sigismund I the Old, until its dissolution in 1506. Szprotawa received town rights around 1260.

Szprotawa was granted town rights around 1260 by Piast Duke Konrad I of Głogów, who also erected new town walls. In the 13th century, Szprotawa was settled by Germans as part of the Ostsiedlung. In 1304, Szprotawa gained full city rights and privileges, including the internal organization of the City Council "Concilium Magistratus". In 1331, together with the Duchy of Głogów, Szprotawa, although ruled by the Polish Piast dynasty, became a fief of the Bohemian (Czech) Crown. In 1506 it was incorporated into the Bohemian Kingdom, although Polish King Sigismund I the Old continued to claim the duchy and the town until 1508. It was since ruled directly by the Bohemian Jagiellons until 1526 and afterwards it was held by the House of Habsburg.

Since the Middle Ages, the town's wealth was primarily attributable to trade, mainly in cattle, salt and grain, from Silesia and Greater Poland to German states. From the 14th century also hammer mills were located there.

After the First Silesian War in 1742 Szprotawa, under the Germanized name Sprottau, fell to Prussia, like almost all Silesia. After the reorganization of Prussia in 1815, Sprottau became part of the province of Silesia, and from 1816, was the seat of the district of Sprottau, part of the government district of Liegnitz. With the Unification of Germany in 1871, Sprottau was incorporated into the German Empire.

In the first half of the 20th century, the city had an economic boom in the iron, textile and wax goods industry. The Wilhelmshütte iron and enamel companies of Aktiengesellschaft furnace employed more than 400 people. In 1939, the city had 12,578 inhabitants. During World War II the Germans established two labour units of the prisoner-of-war camp in Żagań (then Sagan), intended for Italian and Soviet POWs.

During the Second World War, 90 percent of Sprottau was destroyed. The city was occupied by the Red Army in the spring of 1945. After the war, the redrawn in the Potsdam Agreement placed the town, once again, inside Poland. The town's population fled or was expelled and town was resettled by Poles.

Sights
 Old town
 Żagań Gate (Brama Żagańska), from the Middle Ages
 Town hall (Ratusz), from the Renaissance
 Saint Andreas Roman Catholic Church, from the 13th century
 Church of the Assumption, Roman Catholic Church from the 13th century
 Evangelical Church, from the 18th century (old castle)
 Old military airport with nuclear weapons storage
 Castle Chrobry (archeological)
 Silesia Walls

Nature
 Oak "Chrobry", the oldest in Poland (750 years old)
 Nature reserve "Buczyna Szprotawska"
 Nature reserve "Park Słowiański"
 Lower Silesia Forest
 Old city park from the 19th century

Notable people
Jakob Ebert (1549–1614), theologian
Heinrich Göppert (1800–1884), scientist
Heinrich Laube (1806–1884), author
Karl Bartsch (1832–1888), Germanist
Manfred Steinbach (born 1933), sportsman
Klaus Hänsch  (born 1938), politician, President of the European Parliament
Rudolf Langer (born 1939), sportsman
Detlev Kittstein (1944–1996), sportsman
Monika Ciecierska (born 1973), basketball player
Maciej Boryna (born 1974), writer
Konrad Michalak (born 1997), footballer

Twin towns – sister cities
See twin towns of Gmina Szprotawa.

Gallery

See also
Museum of the Szprotawa Land
The Lower Silesia Deep Woods Appreciation Society
Heimatkreisgemeinschaft Sagan Sprottau e.V. Organization of refugees

References

External links
Official town webpage
Official museum webpage
Jewish Community in Szprotawa on Virtual Shtetl

Cities and towns in Lubusz Voivodeship
Żagań County